Vicenç Caraltó i Salvà (Barcelona 1939 – Barcelona 1995) was a Spanish Catalan painter, draftsman and engraver. His first work was shown in 1959.

His works were mainly based on the human body, using very precise drawing technique and excellent illustration, and influenced to a certain extent by Picasso as regards the expression of ideas and images of symbolic content. In his works as a designer,  Caraltó displays a more decorative counterpoint. He also undertook illustrations for books and theater.

References

External links 

1939 births
1995 deaths
People from Barcelona
20th-century Spanish painters
20th-century Spanish male artists
Spanish male painters
Painters from Catalonia
Modern painters
Spanish printmakers
20th-century printmakers
Date of death missing
Date of birth missing